Hadley House is a grade II* listed building on Hadley Green Road facing Hadley Green. The house dates from 1760. The stable block and garden wall are also listed.

Gallery

References

External links

Grade II* listed buildings in the London Borough of Barnet
Houses in the London Borough of Barnet
Monken Hadley
Grade II* listed houses in London
Houses completed in 1760
1760 establishments in England